Spyridon Vikatos (24 September  1878 – 6 June 1960) was a Greek painter, one of the later members of the Munich School.

Life

Spyridon Vikatos was born in Argostoli, Cephalonia, in 1878.
He was assisted by the German Archbishop of Athens to study painting at the Athens School of Fine Arts, where he was taught by Nikiforos Lytras and Spyridon Prosalentis.
He went on to the Academy of Fine Arts in Munich where he studied with Nikolaos Gyzis and Ludwig von Löfftz. 
He was awarded the silver medal and a prize in a drawing competition in 1903. 
He returned to Athens and taught at the School of Fine Arts from 1909 until 1940. Sofia Zengo Papadhimitri, Yiannis Spyropoulos and Victor Ioannides were among his pupils.
Another of his pupils was Sophia Laskaridou.
He died in Athens in 1960.

Work

Vikatos mainly painted portraits and genre subjects. 
His paintings show the influence of German academicism and also of the 17th century Flemish School.
To a lesser extent he painted historical and religious compositions, still lifes, landscapes.
He is noted for his depictions of old people, either alone or in larger compositions.

Vikatos participated in solo, group and international exhibitions, including the Bordeaux International Exposition in 1907 (gold medal), Rome in 1911, Paris in 1937 and the Venice Biennale in 1934 and 1936. in 1937 he received the national Medal of Arts and Letters, and in 1951 the Academy of Munich elected him an honorary member of the Fine Arts.
Some of his work is held by the Municipal Art Gallery of Ioannina and the Municipal Art Gallery of Chania.

Notes

Sources

1878 births
1960 deaths
Greek artists
Munich School
People from Argostoli
Academic staff of the Athens School of Fine Arts
Commanders Crosses of the Order of Merit of the Federal Republic of Germany
19th-century Greek painters
20th-century Greek painters